Daisy Town (also known as Lucky Luke) is a 1971 French-Belgian film based upon the comic book character Lucky Luke and making it his first animated appearance. A Lucky Luke comic based on the film, with the title Daisy Town was released in 1982, drawn by Pascal Dabère.

Plot
Crossing the plains, a wagon train comes across a solitary daisy growing out of the vast wasteland. The leader of the expedition decides that the rest of their party will set up their new town on the site. In honor of the flower, the citizens name the new homestead, 'Daisy Town'. However, no sooner is the town finished, then it begins to attract all manner of trouble-makers and desperadoes.

One day, Lucky Luke comes riding into town astride his horse, Jolly Jumper. After taking care of most of the trouble in the saloon, Luke is assailed on his way to find quarters for the night. However, every single outlaw is taken care of by Luke. These actions don't go unnoticed by the townsfolk. The next morning, The mayor and several more townsfolk go to meet with Luke, asking him if he would accept the position of Sheriff of Daisy Town. Luke replies with one word: "Yep".

It looks like peace has returned until word comes that the Dalton Brothers are in the vicinity. The Daltons begin robbing stores and even blow up the local hotel. Luke tries to incite the townsfolk to stop them, but most are apt to just let the Daltons have their way. This causes Luke to renounce being the town's sheriff.

The Daltons decide to run for major positions in the town. Joe Dalton decides to run for mayor, William Dalton for judge, and Jack Dalton for sheriff. When Averell Dalton asks what position he can run for, the others decide to simply make him their campaign manager. Luke uses this to his advantage and turns Averell against his brothers. The four brothers begin fighting each other and voting is called off.

The Daltons are tarred and feathered, and run out of town. Some distance off, they are accosted by some Indians, and taken captive. In a scheme to get free, Joe Dalton tells the chief of the tribe that the settlers coming across the land will mean the end of the prairie. His words end up inciting the chief to declare war on Daisy Town.

Lucky Luke manages to view the tribe's preparations for war and alerts the townsfolk. Luke works out a plan to make the Indians believe the settlers are abandoning the town but will load the conestoga wagons with armed men. The plan works, and the Indians try to attack. Luke calls for the wagons to circle, and then orders them to all turnaround. This strange spectacle happens several more times. The chief becomes dizzy from the constant turning around and calls for a pow-wow.

A peace treaty is instituted and everyone celebrates. The Mayor toasts Luke's work, proclaiming Daisy Town's bright future. However, no sooner has this toast been made, than a man runs into town shouting that gold has been found in the hills. With that news, all the inhabitants abandon Daisy Town, which quickly takes on the look of a ghost town. Before he leaves, Lucky Luke plucks the daisy at the base of the town's sign, putting it into Jolly Jumper's mane. The town's sign falls over into the dust, as Luke rides off into the sunset.

Production
The film is based on the series of comic books by Morris which was first published in 1946, this 1971 animated feature follows an original plot, but incorporates many characters and elements from previously published books. An adaptation of the film itself was finally published as a Lucky Luke album in 1983. Furthermore, a live-action version directed by and starring Terence Hill was released theatrically in some European countries in 1991. This served as the pilot to a short-lived live-action TV series, which used Daisy Town as the backdrop for most of its action.

In the Spanish language version, the story is not narrated by the horse unlike the original French.

For the English version, Canadian actor Rich Little voiced all the characters, using celebrity impersonations (Gary Cooper for Lucky Luke, James Stewart for the narrator, Boris Karloff for the undertaker Mathias Bones, etc.)

Published versions

There are several books based on this film.

In 1971, with the release of the film, a large-format book was published by Dargaud Éditeur, entitled Histoire d'un dessin animé - Lucky Luke. The book is made up of the story of the film illustrated by photos of the film. This story is followed in the same publication by a succession of all the stages in the construction of the cartoon in the cinema.

In 1972, Éditions PEG, offered by the TOTAL network, published the illustrated story of the film (not the same as in the previous book) entitled Lucky Luke - Daisy town.

In 1983, Daisy Town, a comic book retranscribed from the film, drawn by Pascal Dabère (from the Studio Dargaud), was released. This book has the usual album format and is part of the standard collection (T20 at Dargaud).

Album references
Although the plot was not based on any of the previously released Lucky Luke albums, almost every character and every incident in the film is a reference to the albums.  For example, the idea of the Dalton Brothers trying to take over the town by becoming sheriff, judge, etc., is based on Lucky Luke contre Joss Jamon.  The burgomeister is based on Herbert Hoofer from Le Pied-tendre and the barman is based on George le Barman from the same album.

Cast

Additional Voices
 Jacques Bodoin
 André Legal
 Jacques Hilling
 Denise Bosc

References

External links

1971 Western (genre) films
1971 animated films
1971 films
1970s French animated films
Belgian animated films
Films based on Belgian comics
Animated films based on comics
French animated films
French Western (genre) films
Lucky Luke films
Lucky Luke albums
Belgian children's films
French children's films
Films directed by René Goscinny
Films adapted into comics
Western (genre) animated films
Films with screenplays by René Goscinny
Films produced by René Goscinny
Films with screenplays by Morris (cartoonist)
Films with screenplays by Pierre Tchernia
Films scored by Claude Bolling
1970s French-language films
French-language Belgian films